Zionsville or Zionville may refer to:

Zionsville, Indiana
Zionville, North Carolina
Zionsville, Pennsylvania